The FIA WTCC Race of the United States was a round of the World Touring Car Championship, held at Sonoma Raceway in Sonoma, California.  It was first held in the 2012 World Touring Car Championship season.  Each race consists of 13 laps of the  circuit.

It was originally included in the schedule for the 2014 season but was dropped from the calendar in June 2014 due to logistical issues, to be replaced by an additional round in China.

For the event, the circuit was modified. It used the full circuit, but with the bus stop chicane replacing the esses.

Winners

References